James "Billy" Dankert is an American musician from Austin, Minnesota, United States, best known as the drummer, singer and songwriter for Minnesota-based band the Gear Daddies. Dankert's songs include "Time Heals", "Blues Mary", and "One Voice".   After the break-up of the band in 1992, he returned to school to study language and literature. He has released three solo albums: Bowling Shoes Blues on the Crackpot Records label in 1993; The Vanishing Head on the Veto Records label in 2001; and In Spite on the Veto Records label in 2003. A fourth solo album, The Past Is Not Complete, was recorded in 2005 but never released. His fifth solo album, Sleep Late, is scheduled for self-release in April 2016, after a successful Kickstarter campaign to fund its pressing.

Dankert now resides in St. Paul, Minnesota, playing reunion gigs with the Gear Daddies. He has drummed for several other acts like Slim Dunlap, Shimmy, and Doug Collins and the Receptionists, and The Reverend Angus Strychn Trio.  He is also a successful freelance artist.

References

Year of birth missing (living people)
American drummers
Songwriters from Minnesota
Musicians from Minnesota
Living people